Orties was a French hip-hop group from Bures-Sure-Yvette in Essonne, France composed of twin sisters, Antha and Alexandra Dezzi (known by her pseudonym "Kincy") that was active from 2009-2016.

Biography
Based from Paris suburb's city, Bures-sur-Yvette, they started musical careers at the age of 15. Their name Orties is a reference to Baudelaire’s Les Fleurs du mal. They started as a gothic rock band but soon the project evolved toward rap music combined with French lyrics. The two sisters described the mix of genre, as the Nouvelle Chanson Francaise (New French Song). Orties released their first EP La Boum October 2010 on Believe Music. Their controversial track "Plus putes que toutes les putes" (Bitchier than any bitches), remixed by Lecter (Booty Call Records) was playlisted by Skrillex in his essential mix on BBC Radio. In February 2013, Sextape their first album was released on Nuun Records.

Critical reception
They received support from Technikart and mainstream press periodic such as Elle Magazine, and Glamour etc.
In June 2016, they featured four pages on Les Inrockuptibles’ special issue with Michel Houellebecq as main contributor. They released a new single on June 23, 2016, titled "SEXEDROGUEHORREUR" as well as a music video directed by Jean Bocheux. Their second Album Nouvelle Chanson Francaise was scheduled to be released in mid 2017.

References

21st-century French musicians
Musical groups from Paris
French hip hop groups
French rock music groups